Peeping Tom it is the first album by German eurodance/trance project S.E.X. Appeal. The album was released 1999 and spawned the four singles "Sex is a thrill with the pill", "Hanky Spanky", "Manga maniac" and "Kids in America", a Kim Wilde cover, the latter labeled as Lyane Leigh only.  The song Fragile love has been released in a remixed version seven years later in 2006 and appeared on the second studio album Sensuality.

Track listing 

   Peeping Tom - 3:51   
   Fragile Love - 3:41   
   Hanky Spanky - 3:39   
   It's Called Atlantis - 4:02   
   Here We Go - 4:00   
   Manga Maniac - 3:37   
   Total Eclipse - 4:06   
   Sex is a Thrill with a Pill - 3:46   
   Baby I Miss You - 4:38   
   Megamix - 5:10   
   Kids in America - 6:52   
   Hanky Spanky (S.e.x.tended Version) - 5:40   
   Manga Maniac (S.e.x.tended Version) - 5:48

1999 debut albums
S.E.X. Appeal albums